= Nana King (musician) =

Ghanaian musician

William Osei Amankwa Konadu
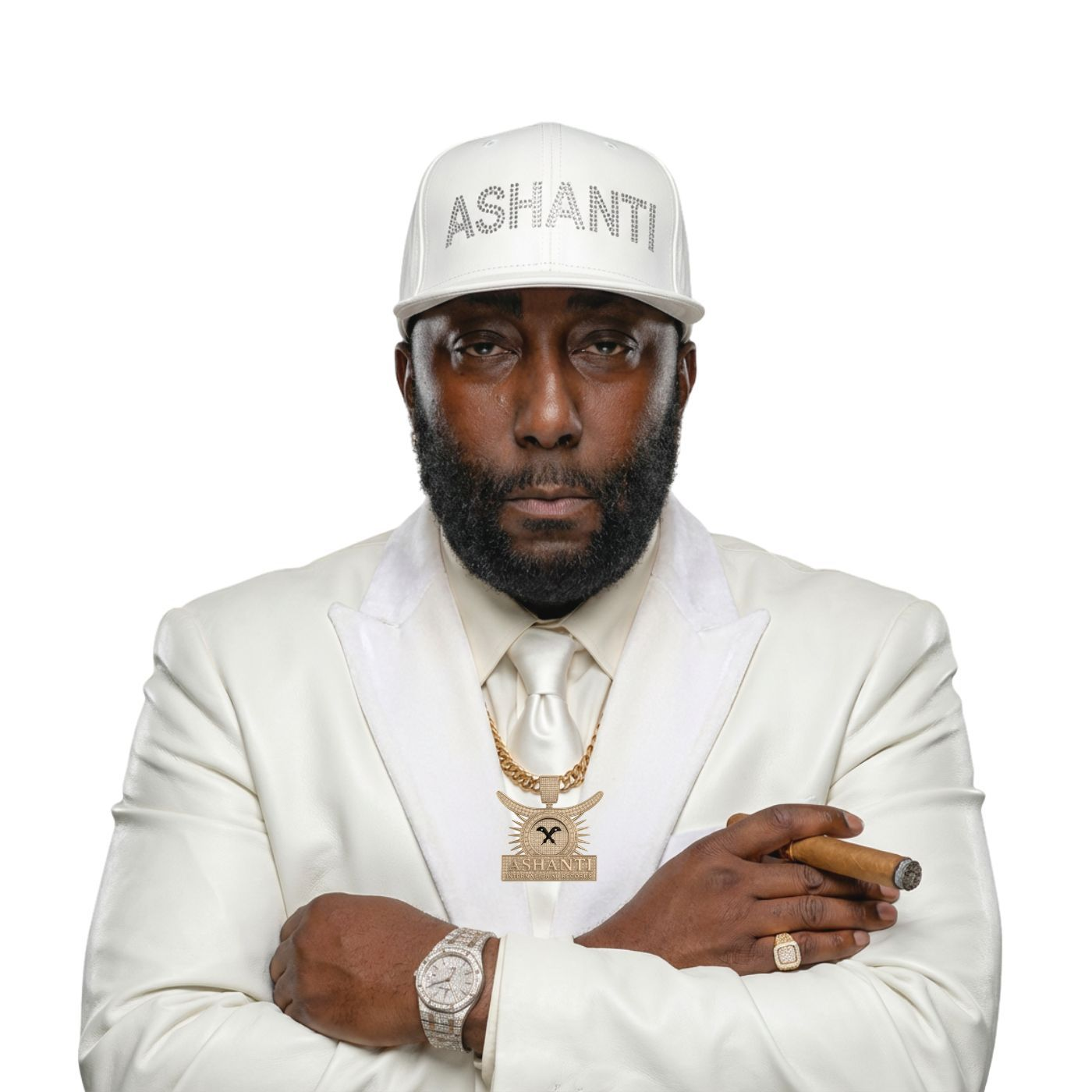
- Hiplife legend Nana King

Background information
- Born: September 24, 1965 (age 60)
- Origin: Los Angeles, California, U.S.
- Genres: R&B, hip-hop, Afrobeat
- Occupations: Musician; Music Producer; Entrepreneur
- Years active: 1980-Present
- Label: Ashanti International Records
- Spouse: Precious "Nana Queen" Jewel Tubman-Konadu

William Osei Amankwa Konadu (known professionally as Nana King) is an American-born musician, record producer, tech entrepreneur, and philanthropist. He is known for fusing Ghanaian highlife with hip-hop, R&B, and Afrobeat, and for founding the social platform Splassher.

== Early Life and Musical Beginnings ==
Konadu was born in Los Angeles, California, to Ghanaian parents. He began playing guitar at age five and performed in metal and rock bands throughout his youth. His musical path eventually led him to Ghana, where he blended his American influences with traditional West African music styles.

== Music Career ==
In the late 1990s, Nana King gained national attention in Ghana after founding Ashanti International Records. His second album, Champion (1999), topped Ghana’s Joy FM charts for 34 consecutive weeks.

In 2025, Nana King signed new artists to his Ashanti International Records label and continues to release new music.

In 2026, Nana King released new music, a 25-track album titled “4EVR Champion Vol 1”.

He has produced, and collaborated with top Ghanaian artists including, Samini, Ex-Doe and VIP (Vision In Progress). Nana King signed Samini to his first record deal on King’s Ashanti International record label.

Nana King has also performed alongside global icons such as Tupac Shakur, Jay-Z, and Akon.

== Discography ==
- “4EVR Champion Vol 1” (2026)
- Champion Remastered Feat. Ex-Doe (2026)
- Holiday Flex (2025)
- Turning Around (2024)
- Mad Worl (2019)
- Take it Off (2015)
- It’s On (2015)
- Testify (2012)
- The Beginning (2007)
- Scary (2001)
- Champion (1999)
- Obaa Pa (1998)

== Media and Television ==
Nana King served as a judge on the talent series Stars of the Future and has acted in Ghanaian sitcoms and dramas. He also founded Ceenii, the film production arm of his media company Wilkon Media, to produce African content for global streaming.

== Entrepreneurship ==
In 2016, Konadu launched Splassher, a multimedia social platform aimed at empowering African creators and bridging global creative communities. He currently serves as CEO of Splassher, Inc. and Chairman of Wilkon Media Group.

== Awards and Recognition ==
- Best Album of the Year – Ghana Music Awards for Champion
- Featured judge on Stars of the Future talent show
- Recognized for cultural innovation by Ghanaian entertainment media

== Philanthropy ==
Nana King is active in mentoring young artists, offering free studio access to underprivileged youth, and supporting girls in tech and media across Ghana. Through Splassher and Wilkon Media, he produces content that promotes mental health awareness and celebrates African identity.

== Legacy ==
William "Nana King" Konadu continues to influence Africa’s creative industries through his work in music, entrepreneurship, and advocacy.
